"We May Never Love Like This Again" is a song written by Al Kasha and Joel Hirschhorn for the 1974 disaster film The Towering Inferno. It won the Academy Award for Best Original Song, and was performed by Maureen McGovern both for the film score and, briefly, in the film itself with McGovern portraying a singer. 

Her recording was issued as a single along with her rendition of "Wherever Love Takes Me", a song from the movie Gold, which would compete with "We May Never Love Like This Again" for the Best Song Oscar, serving as B-side. "We May Never Love Like This Again" reached #83 on the Billboard Hot 100, and the single was a top-five hit in Australia.

Background
McGovern had previously performed Kasha and Hirschhorn's song "The Morning After" for The Poseidon Adventure, which also won the Academy Award for Best Original Song two years prior. Due to her associations with two Oscar-winning songs, McGovern recorded Academy Award Performance: And the Envelope, Please an album comprising Oscar-winning songs, which included both "The Morning After" and "We May Never Love Like This  Again".

Hollywood composer John Williams wrote the original music score for the film, and interpolated the tune of the song into the underscore of the movie. The actual 1974 song recording for the album (subsequently released as a single) was produced by Carl Maduri for Belkin-Maduri Productions.  It was arranged by Joe Hudson and was engineered by Arnie Rosenberg.

Chart performance

Weekly charts

Year-end charts

References

External links
 Lyrics of this song
 

1974 singles
Maureen McGovern songs
Best Original Song Academy Award-winning songs
Love themes
Songs written for films
Songs written by Al Kasha
Songs written by Joel Hirschhorn
1974 songs
20th Century Fox Records singles
1970s ballads
Film theme songs